The Bayer designations c Puppis and C Puppis are distinct and refer to two different stars in the constellation Puppus:
c Puppis (HD 63032)
C Puppis (HD 53704)

Puppis, c
Puppis